The NS 3600 was a series of express steam locomotives of the Dutch Railways (NS) and its predecessors Maatschappij tot Exploitatie van Staatsspoorwegen (SS) and Nederlandsche Centraal-Spoorweg-Maatschappij (NCS).

History
The first two locomotives, Nos. 71 and 72, were delivered in 1910, and Nos. 73 to 78 followed in 1911 to 1914. 73-78 did not have a fully streamlined cab, and 75-78 also had slightly different tenders. Because of their conical shaped smokebox door, these locomotives soon got the nickname "Zeppelins".

In 1919, the operation of the NCS was taken over by the SS, with these locomotives being included in the SS numbering as 971–978. When the locomotives and rolling stock of the SS and the HSM was merged in 1921, the locomotives of this series were given the NS numbers 3601–3608. In 1925, these locomotives were rebuilt with a boiler that was practically the same as that of the series NS 3700, because of the wider Belpaire firebox the cab lost its streamlined shape. In 1935 the locomotives had brakes fitted on the bogie, and they received a fully welded tender that had the same water and coal capacity as the tender of the series NS 3900. The maximum speed could therefore be increased to 110 km/h. The last locomotive of this series was withdrawn from service in 1953. No engine has survived into preservation.

Units

Gallery

Sources 

 N. J. van Wijck Jurriaanse: De Nederlandsche Centraal Spoorwegmaatschappij. Uitg. Wyt, Rotterdam, 1973. 
 H. Waldorp: Onze Nederlandse stoomlocomotieven in woord en beeld, 5e geheel herziene druk. Uitg. De Alk, Alkmaar, 1981. .
 R.C. Statius Muller, A.J. Veenendaal jr., H. Waldorp: De Nederlandse stoomlocomotieven. Uitg. De Alk, Alkmaar, 2005. .
 A. Weijts: Tussen vuur en stoom. Uitg. Europese Bibliotheek, Zaltbommel, 2001. .
 Martin van Oostrom: Stoomlocomotieven NCS serie 71-78 (NS 3600). Uitg. Uquilair, Rosmalen, 1988. .
 Het Utrechts Archief

Steam locomotives of the Netherlands
4-6-0 locomotives
Maffei locomotives
Rolling stock of the Netherlands
Nederlandsche Centraal-Spoorweg-Maatschappij